Looking for the Morning is the second album by Northern Irish singer Gemma Hasson. It was released in 1975 in Ireland by EMI Ireland and produced by Leo O'Kelly.

Track listing

Personnel
Gemma Hasson – vocals, guitars
Leo O'Kelly – guitars, mandolin, fiddle, vocals
Paul Barrett – keyboards, bass guitar, vocals
Michael Fitzgerald – guitars on "Rathdrum Fair", vocals
Dónal Lunny – bouzouki, bodhrán, whistle
Paul Brady – guitarra, bodhrán, whistle

Production
Leo O'Kelly – production
Paul Barrett – arrangements
Bob Harper, Par Morley, Keith Manfield – engineering
Ronnie Norton – cover design & photography
Dave Macken – back cover photography

Release history

References

1975 albums
Gemma Hasson albums
Albums produced by Leo O'Kelly
EMI Records albums